The Soyuz-U2 (GRAU index 11A511U2) was a Soviet, later Russian, carrier rocket. It was derived from the Soyuz-U, and a member of the R-7 family of rockets. It featured increased performance compared with the baseline Soyuz-U, due to the use of syntin propellant, as opposed to RP-1 paraffin, used on the Soyuz-U.

The increased payload of the Soyuz-U2 allowed heavier spacecraft to be launched, while lighter spacecraft could be placed in higher orbits, compared to those launched by Soyuz-U rockets. In 1996, it was announced that the Soyuz-U2 had been retired, as the performance advantage gained through the use of syntin did not justify the additional cost of its production. The final flight, Soyuz TM-22, occurred on 3 September 1995 from Gagarin's Start in Baikonur.

The Soyuz-U2 was first used to launch four Zenit reconnaissance satellites, then it delivered crewed Soyuz spacecraft to space stations Salyut 7 and Mir: missions Soyuz T-12 to T-15 and Soyuz TM-1 to TM-22. It also supplied the stations with Progress cargo spacecraft: Progress 20 to Salyut 7, Progress 25 to 42 to Mir, followed by the new generation Progress M-1 to M-18 and finally M-23. Other missions included the Gamma telescope and three Orlets reconnaissance satellites. In total, Soyuz-U2 was launched 72 times and experienced no failures over its operational lifetime.

See also

 List of R-7 launches

References

R-7 (rocket family)
Space launch vehicles of the Soviet Union
Space launch vehicles of Russia
Soyuz program
Vehicles introduced in 1982